Opel is a 1988 album compiled from recordings made by former Pink Floyd frontman Syd Barrett between 1968 and 1970. The album is a compilation of unreleased material and alternate takes of recordings from sessions for Barrett's solo albums, The Madcap Laughs and Barrett. Before they were vetoed by Pink Floyd, the album was to include two unreleased tracks that Barrett had worked on while with Pink Floyd, "Scream Thy Last Scream" and "Vegetable Man".

Opel was released in October 1988 on Harvest in the UK, and on Capitol Records in the US. The album was remastered and reissued in 1993, along with Barrett's other albums, The Madcap Laughs and Barrett (both 1970), independently and as part of the Crazy Diamond box set. A newly remastered version was released in 2010.

Background
The album was originally set to include the unreleased Barrett Pink Floyd songs "Scream Thy Last Scream" and "Vegetable Man", which had been remixed for the album by Jones. However, the two songs were pulled by Pink Floyd before Opel was finalised.

While Barrett only released two albums, The Madcap Laughs and Barrett, both in 1970, the existence of unreleased studio work was widely reported. After years of demand from Barrett's considerable fan base, Opel was compiled and released. Barrett personally approved the new release.

Release and content

Opel consists of eight previously unreleased songs and alternate versions of six already released songs. The album was released due to the constant pressure from The Madcap Laughs producer, Malcolm Jones. Despite its positive reviews, it failed to chart. AllMusic reviewer Richie Unterberger said the album was "charming", with the title track, "Swan Lee (Silas Lang)", "Dark Globe" and "Milky Way" as highlights.

Opel (along with The Madcap Laughs and Barrett) was reissued both independently and as part of the Crazy Diamond Barrett box set, on 26 April 1993. A newly remastered version was released in 2010.

Track listing
All songs written by Syd Barrett, except "Golden Hair" (music by Barrett, based on a poem by James Joyce). All track information is taken from the Crazy Diamond version of Opel.

Original release

1993 reissue

Personnel
Syd Barrett – guitar, vocals, producer
David Gilmour – producer
Peter Jenner – producer
Malcolm Jones – producer
Roger Waters – producer
Gareth Cousins - mix engineer

Guest musicians on "Clowns and Jugglers":
Mike Ratledge – organ
Robert Wyatt – drums
Hugh Hopper – bass

References
Footnotes

Citations

Syd Barrett albums
1988 compilation albums
Albums produced by David Gilmour
Harvest Records compilation albums
EMI Records compilation albums